Wiesław Hartman (23 October 1950 – 24 November 2021) was a Polish show jumping equestrian, Olympic medallist.

Life and career
Hartman was born in Kwidzyn, Poland, on 23 October 1950.

He participated at the 1980 Summer Olympics in Moscow, where he won a silver medal in team jumping.

Hartman died on 24 November 2021, at the age of 71.

References

1950 births
2021 deaths
Olympic silver medalists for Poland
Equestrians at the 1980 Summer Olympics
Olympic equestrians of Poland
Polish male equestrians
Olympic medalists in equestrian
People from Kwidzyn
Sportspeople from Pomeranian Voivodeship
Medalists at the 1980 Summer Olympics
20th-century Polish people